The Guardian Angel is a 1990 Swedish drama film directed by Suzanne Osten. Malin Ek won the award for Best Actress at the 26th Guldbagge Awards.

Cast
 Pia Bäckström as Maria Demodov
 Malin Ek as Livia Birkman
 Etienne Glaser as Joel Birkman
 Hanna Hartleb as Hanna
 Björn Kjellman as Welja
 Tuncel Kurtiz as Ivar
 Sven Lindqvist as Polisministern
 Lena Nylén as Jessica
 Gunilla Röör as Katja
 Reuben Sallmander as Konstantin
 Lars Wiik as Secretary
 Philip Zandén as Jacob

See also
The Last Summer (1954)

References

External links
 
 

1990 films
1990 drama films
Swedish drama films
1990s Swedish-language films
Films based on short fiction
Films directed by Suzanne Osten
1990s Swedish films